Dubrovo is a rural locality (a village) in Denisovskoye Rural Settlement, Gorokhovetsky District, Vladimir Oblast, Russia. The population was 16 as of 2010.

Geography 
Dubrovo is located 26 km southwest of Gorokhovets (the district's administrative centre) by road. Vnukovo is the nearest rural locality.

References 

Rural localities in Gorokhovetsky District